The president of the Republic of North Macedonia is the head of state of North Macedonia.

The office was first established a few months before the declaration of independence on 8 September 1991. The first president was Kiro Gligorov, the oldest president in the world until his resignation in 1999. Although largely a ceremonial position, with most of the legislative power being vested in the prime minister and the Assembly, the president is the commander-in-chief of the armed forces and the first body for performing foreign affairs.

Presidential rights and obligations are determined by the Constitution and laws. The president must be a citizen of North Macedonia, be over 40 years of age and have lived in North Macedonia for at least ten of the previous fifteen years before election.

Electoral system
The president of North Macedonia is elected using a modified two-round system; a candidate can only be elected in the first round of voting if they receive the equivalent of over 50% of the vote from all registered voters. In the second round, voter turnout must be at least 40% for the result to be deemed valid.

The Constitution mandates that the president must be over 40 years of age and have lived in the country for ten of the last fifteen years before election day.

Before 2009, the constitution required a 50% turnout in the second round. The XXXI amendment to the constitution, voted on 9 January 2009 by all 86 present deputies, lowered it to the current 40%, as the government feared the tendency of ever lower election turnout would make presidential elections frequently invalidated. In the 2009 Macedonian presidential election that followed, the turnout in the second round ended up being 42.6%.

History
During the period of the Socialist Republic of Macedonia, there was a collective presidency which was abolished in 1991. Its first president was Metodija Andonov Čento, elected at the first plenary session of ASNOM, when the modern state was formed, while the last one was Vladimir Mitkov.

Following the transition from socialist system to parliamentary democracy in 1990, the Socialist Republic of Macedonia changed the collective leadership with a single-president post in 1991, few months before independence. Kiro Gligorov became the first president of the Socialist Republic of Macedonia on 27 January 1991. On 16 April 1991 the parliament adopted a constitutional amendment removing the term "Socialist" from the official name of the country, and on 7 June of the same year, the new name Republic of Macedonia was officially established. Hence Gligorov continued his function as President of the Republic of Macedonia.

After the process of dissolution of Yugoslavia began, the Republic of Macedonia proclaimed full independence following a referendum held on 8 September 1991. Kiro Gligorov was incapacitated after an assassination attempt in 1995. Stojan Andov served as acting president for 44 days during Gligorov's incapacitation. On completing his second term as head of the independent state, Gligorov was succeeded by Boris Trajkovski in 1999. Following Trajkovski's death in 2004, he was succeeded by Branko Crvenkovski. Gjorge Ivanov won the 2009 presidential election and took office on 12 May 2009. He was re-elected in 2014. Stevo Pendarovski is the current incumbent and he took the office on 12 May 2019.

The position initially had some considerable powers, as Macedonia functioned within the framework of a de facto semi-presidential republic. The president had control over the military and was the primary actor when it came to setting the foreign policy agenda. As such, both Gligorov and Trajkovski were the primary representatives of the fledgling republic abroad. The 2001 Ohrid Agreement, brokered by President Trajkovski in an effort to reduce interethnic tensions in the country, led to the adoption of constitutional amendments on November 16, 2001, which, in addition to granting representational rights to the Albanian-speaking minority, also stripped the president of any executive authority he previously had. President Trajkovski respected this arrangement for the remainder of his term, with authority over foreign policy passing first to Prime Minister Ljupco Georgievski and then to Prime Minister Branko Crvenkovski. 

After Trajkovski's tragic death in 2004, Crvenkovski was elected as the next president, and it was widely expected that he would remain in de facto control of the government. Owing to his clout in the Social Democratic Union, Crvenkovski maintained some level of control over foreign affairs during the premiership of Hari Kostov, but with the election of Vlado Buckovski, the new leader of the Social Democratic Union, as prime minister, Crvenkovski largely refrained from interfering with the government and limited his activities to ceremonial matters. While Crvenkovski was opposed to Nikola Gruevski after the latter's election as prime minister, there was little that he could have done, as by that time the presidency had very little authority.

In 2009, Crvenkovski was replaced as president by Gjorge Ivanov, an ally of Gruevski. After Greuvski resigned in 2016, an interim government led by Emil Dimitriev was inaugurated, but President Gjorge Ivanov largely took de facto lead over governance and halted judicial inquiries into Gruevski administration officials implicated in the wiretapping scandal. This caused massive protests, including calls for Ivanov's impeachment. 

With the inauguration of Zoran Zaev executive authority returned to the government. In 2019, Ivanov was succeeded by Zaev ally Stevo Pendarovski as president. In 2020, Zaev briefly resigned as prime minister and was replaced by Oliver Spasovski. During Spasovski's interim premiership, President Pendarovski came to the fore as the country's leader, most notably in first declaring and then ending the country's State of Emergency in the fight against COVID-19. Pendarovski largely gave up his increased executive authority when Zaev returned as prime minister at the end of the year. In 2022, Zaev was replaced as prime minister by Dimitar Kovacevski.

List of presidents

SR Macedonia
 Parties

 Status

Republic of Macedonia / North Macedonia
 Parties

 Status

Latest election

See also

Vice President of North Macedonia
Prime Minister of North Macedonia
List of presidents of the Assembly of the Republic of North Macedonia

References

External links
Official site of the president of North Macedonia

 
Government of North Macedonia
Presidents
1991 establishments in the Republic of Macedonia